Lynsey Riann Frances Askew (born 3 September 1986) is an English former cricketer who played as a right-arm medium bowler and right-handed batter. She appeared in eight One Day Internationals and six Twenty20 Internationals for England between 2006 and 2008. She played domestic cricket for Kent, Otago and Australian Capital Territory.

Early and personal life

Askew was born on 3 September 1986 in Bromley, Greater London.

In 1995, at the age of 9, Askew, together with some friends, started a ladies team at Hayes Cricket Club. She attended Hayes School and was part of the team that won the 2002 National Under-15 Championship.

Askew is married to former Australian cricketer Alex Blackwell.

Domestic career

Askew played county cricket for Kent, initially between 2002 and 2009. She later returned for brief stints in 2012 and 2015. She had a brief spell with Otago in 2008/09 and played for Australian Capital Territory between 2010 and 2014.

International career

Askew took six wickets in One Day Internationals and six wickets in Twenty20 Internationals. She made her international high score of 68 in a One Day International against New Zealand at Chemplast Cricket Ground, Chennai on 3 March 2007. Her partnership of 73 with Isa Guha set a new record for highest ninth-wicket partnership in Women's One Day Internationals, which remains unbroken.

References

External links
 

1986 births
Living people
People from Bromley
England women One Day International cricketers
England women Twenty20 International cricketers
ACT Meteors cricketers
Kent women cricketers
Otago Sparks cricketers
LGBT cricketers
English LGBT sportspeople